PerfectDisk is a defragmentation software product for Windows developed by Raxco.

The application keeps track of file usage to lessen defragmentation time and offers two modes of basic defragging: "quick" and "SmartPlacement".

History
During the 1980s, a software package titled "Disk-Optimizer" was marketed as part of the collective name "RAXCO Rabbit Software."

PerfectDisk was released in 1990 for the VMS operating system. A version for Windows NT followed later in 1997. PerfectDisk contains scheduler supporting also client PCs in the network.

Competition
The standard Windows "Disk Defragmenter" is based on a subset of a competing, now-discontinued product named Diskeeper. For those seeking additional features, PerfectDisk and the full-feature Diskeeper are among their options; these are intended for high-end users, and feature optimizing the placement of "system files and free space."

See also
 File system fragmentation
 Defragmentation   
 Disk Defragmenter (Windows)
 List of defragmentation software
 Comparison of defragmentation software

References

External links
 Microsoft: Troubleshooting Disk Defragmenter
 Official web site  

Defragmentation software
Proprietary software
Computer system optimization software
Utilities for Windows
Disk usage analysis software